Geeta Kashyap Vemuganti is an Indian ocular pathologist and the head of the department at the Ophthalmic Pathology Service and Stem Cell Laboratory of the L. V. Prasad Eye Institute (LVPEI). She is also a dean and professor at the school of medical sciences of the University of Hyderabad.

Vemuganti is reported to have done pioneering work in stem cell therapy and was a member of the team led by V. S. Sangwan that developed a protocol for transplanting cultured stem cells for restoring vision in humans. She is an elected fellow of the National Academy of Medical Sciences and a recipient of the 2005 Chem Tech Foundation Award. The Department of Biotechnology of the Government of India awarded her the National Bioscience Award for Career Development, one of the highest Indian science awards, for her contributions to biosciences in 2004.

Selected bibliography

See also 
 Keratitis
 Stem cell therapy

Notes

References

Further reading

External links 
 
 

N-BIOS Prize recipients
Indian scientific authors
Living people
Indian medical academics
All India Institute of Medical Sciences, New Delhi alumni
Academic staff of the University of Hyderabad
Fellows of the National Academy of Medical Sciences
Indian ophthalmologists
Medical doctors from Hyderabad, India
Stem cell researchers
1960 births